The 2018 Colorado Springs Switchbacks FC season is the club's fourth year of existence, and their fourth season in the Western Conference of the United Soccer League, the second tier of the United States Soccer Pyramid. On January 26, 2018 it was announced that the Colorado Pride Switchbacks U23 will join the Premier Development League’s Mountain Division for the upcoming 2018 season as the PDL partner of the USL’s Colorado Springs Switchbacks FC.

Players

Competitions

Preseason

USL

Results summary

Standings

U.S. Open Cup

Friendlies

Transfers

In

Out

Loan in

References

Colorado Springs Swtichbacks FC
Colorado Springs
Sacramento Republic
Colorado Springs Switchbacks FC seasons